Sean Paul LaChapelle (born July 29, 1970) is a former professional American football wide receiver. He played two seasons in the National Football League (NFL) for the Los Angeles Rams and Kansas City Chiefs.  

LaChapelle attended Vintage High School in Napa, California where he helped lead his team to a Sac-Joaquin Section title in his junior year.  During his career at UCLA LaChapelle became one of the school's receivers catching 142 passes for 2,027 yards with 14 touchdowns.  He was signed to the Chiefs after wide receiver Lake Dawson suffered a season-ending injury and was placed on injured reserve. LaChapelle was also the 1996 World League of American Football (WLAF) offensive MVP.

References

1970 births
Living people
American football wide receivers
UCLA Bruins football players
Los Angeles Rams players
Players of American football from Sacramento, California
Scottish Claymores players
Kansas City Chiefs players